Mark Valentine Chamberlain (born 19 November 1961) is an English former international footballer. He is the younger brother of Neville Chamberlain, and the father of Liverpool and England international player Alex Oxlade-Chamberlain and Aldershot Town's Christian Oxlade-Chamberlain.

He began his professional playing career with Port Vale in 1978, where he remained for four years before being sold on to rivals Stoke City, having already been selected for the PFA Fourth Division Team of the Year in 1981–82. In 1985, he signed with Sheffield Wednesday, before he moved on to Portsmouth three years later. He remained with "Pompey" until 1994, at which point he transferred to Brighton & Hove Albion. The following year he joined Exeter City, before entering into management at Fareham Town in 1997. Between 1982 and 1984 he won four caps for the England under-21s and eight caps for the senior team.

Club career

Port Vale
Chamberlain was born in Burslem, Stoke-on-Trent, Staffordshire, to Banny and Anastasia, who emigrated to England from Jamaica in the 1960s. Chamberlain started his career with local side Port Vale, making his debut under Dennis Butler as a substitute in a 2–2 home draw with Scunthorpe United on 19 August 1978, aged 16. His full debut came on 14 April 1979 in a 3–2 win over Barnsley at Vale Park, and his first goal came two days later in a 3–2 defeat at Huddersfield Town. Chamberlain said: "It was a bonus too, to find the net. Neil Griffiths encouraged me to 'hit it', after I had nipped in before the full back, and the ball flew in." He turned professional the following month, having made eight appearances in 1978–79. Chamberlain then made eleven goalless appearances in 1979–80, whilst his brother was the club's top-scorer in what was Vale's worst season in the Fourth Division. He became a first team regular from October 1980 under John McGrath and scored 10 goals in 36 games in the 1980–81 campaign. He was an ever-present in the 55 game 1981–82 season, also being selected in the PFA Fourth Division team and chosen as The Stars best player of the division. He scored eight goals during the campaign, most memorably when he stood off the pitch at Field Mill to avoid being caught offside, then returned to tackle a startled Rod Arnold and tap the ball into an empty net.

Stoke City
He was sold to local rivals Stoke City in August 1982, along with Mark Harrison for a combined fee of £180,000. His brother also made the switch later in the season. Asked if this move caused him to receive any "stick" from his friends, he replied: "No not really. Mind you I wouldn't, I didn't really have any mates." He proved to be a good signing for manager Richie Barker, and got the better of Arsenal's left-back Kenny Sansom. He replaced Paul Maguire on the left-wing and scored six goals in 39 appearances in 1982–83 as the "Potters" finished 13th in the First Division. Chamberlain scored seven goals in 46 games in 1983–84, helping the club to avoid relegation by two places and two points. However, he scored just twice in 32 appearances in 1984–85, as Stoke finished bottom of the division with a mere 17 points; they won just three of their 42 games and were 23 points short of safety. Barker had abandoned Chamberlain and the midfield in favour of desperate long ball tactics. New manager Mick Mills stabilised the club in the Second Division in 1985–86, but let Chamberlain go as he wished to build his own team.

Sheffield Wednesday
In September 1985, he moved on to Sheffield Wednesday for a fee of £300,000, who went on to finish fifth in the top-flight under Howard Wilkinson in 1985–86, missing out on European football due to the ban imposed on English clubs following the Heysel Stadium disaster. The "Owls" finished 13th in 1986–87 and 11th in 1987–88, with Chamberlain playing 66 league games before transferring to Alan Ball's Second Division side Portsmouth in August 1988 for a fee of £200,000.

Portsmouth
"Pompey" finished two places above the drop in 1988–89, before 12th and 17th finishes in 1989–90 and 1990–91. He then helped Jim Smith's side to the FA Cup semi-finals in 1991–92, and featured in the 1–1 draw with Liverpool at Highbury, but not in the replay at Villa Park. The club finished in third-place in 1992–93, missing out on automatic promotion by goal difference, and were beaten by Leicester City at the play-off semi-final stage. They then finished a disappointing 17th in 1993–94, and Chamberlain moved on to Liam Brady's Brighton & Hove Albion in August 1994, having played 167 games in his six years at Fratton Park.

Later career
The "Seagulls" finished 14th in the Second Division (the old Third Division) in 1993–94, and Chamberlain moved on to Exeter City in the Third Division (the old Fourth Division). Peter Fox's "Grecians" finished bottom of the Football League in 1994–95, albeit level on goal difference with Scarborough, and only avoided dropping into the Conference because Macclesfield Town's Moss Rose did not meet the Football League's capacity standards. Chamberlain was converted to the right-back position. Exeter rallied to a 14th-place finish in 1995–96, though Chamberlain left St James Park after the club finished third-from-bottom in 1996–97, ahead of rock bottom Hereford United by just the one point.

International career
An England under-21 international, Chamberlain broke into the England senior squad under Bobby Robson during his first season at Stoke City, scoring on his debut against Luxembourg at Wembley on 15 December 1982, at age 21. During the match, teammate Luther Blissett became the first black player to score for England, having bagged two of his three goals before Chamberlain found the net. He also made a substitute appearance in the 1–0 home defeat to Denmark on 21 September 1983; this crucial result eventually led the Danes to win qualification to Euro 1984 ahead of England. He picked up a total of eight caps, though some believed he could have gone on to pick up many more, and Port Vale coach Graham Barnett in particular said that he was "like a bloody gazelle... a black jewel... he's got the bloody lot... he's class... so much better than John Barnes."

Style of play
Chamberlain was a pacey winger with excellent ball control and decision making. Stoke City fan and author Simon Lowe wrote that "His slim, athletic build made him seem taller than his modest 5ft 9in height. But his dribbling style was upright, chest puffed out, with the ball in front being almost toe-ended on by his right foot, while his arms worked like pistons. A favourite trick saw Chamberlain wave his left foot over the ball and wiggle his hips before jagging it past the defender with the outside of the right foot." Former Port Vale teammate Robbie Earle wrote that "He could do it all: Run, pass, shoot, make goals and score them. Chambo was the perfect wide man who could play on either flank and delighted in making chances for his teammates".

Coaching career
Chamberlain became player-manager of non-league Fareham Town after leaving the Football League in 1997. In April 2008, he took up the position as assistant coach of the Timor-Leste national football team. Six months later he returned to England and joined the coaching staff at Portsmouth to coach the U13s.

Personal life
Chamberlain married Wendy R. Oxlade in 1991. His sons Alex and Christian are also footballers, as was his older brother Neville. When the pair played together for Port Vale they used to swap shirts at half-time so as to confuse opposition players attempting to mark him. After making his England debut he guest starred on The Sooty Show.

In 2019 and 2020, Chamberlain featured in both seasons of ITV television show Harry's Heroes, which featured former football manager Harry Redknapp attempting get a squad of former England international footballers back fit and healthy for a game against Germany legends.

Career statistics

Club

International

Scores and results list England's goal tally first, score column indicates score after each Chamberlain goal.

HonoursIndividual'
PFA Fourth Division Team of the Year: 1981–82

References

Sportspeople from Burslem
English footballers
England under-21 international footballers
England international footballers
Association football wingers
Association football fullbacks
Black British sportsmen
English people of Jamaican descent
Port Vale F.C. players
Stoke City F.C. players
Sheffield Wednesday F.C. players
Portsmouth F.C. players
Brighton & Hove Albion F.C. players
Exeter City F.C. players
Fareham Town F.C. players
English Football League players
Association football coaches
Association football player-managers
English football managers
Fareham Town F.C. managers
Southern Football League managers
Portsmouth F.C. non-playing staff
1961 births
Living people